John Langdon (died 30 September 1434) was a medieval Bishop of Rochester.

Langdon was admitted a monk of Christ Church, Canterbury, in 1398. Afterwards he studied at Oxford, and is said to have belonged to Gloucester Hall. He was one of twelve Oxford scholars appointed at the suggestion of convocation in 1411 to inquire into the doctrines of Wycliffe. On 17 November 1421 he was appointed by papal provision to the see of Rochester, and was consecrated on 7 June 1422 at Canterbury by Archbishop Chicheley. After his consecration he appears among the royal councillors, and after 1430 his name constantly occurs among those present at the meetings. In February 1432 he was engaged on an embassy to Charles VII of France. On 18 February 1434 he had licence to absent himself from the council if sent on a mission by the pope or cardinals, and on 3 November of that year was appointed to treat for the reformation of the church and peace with France. Langdon had, however, died at Basle on 30 September.

It is commonly alleged that Langdon's body was brought home for burial at the Charterhouse, Loudon, but in reality he was interred in the choir of the Carthusian monastery at Basle.

Citations

References

External links
 
 

Bishops of Rochester
15th-century English Roman Catholic bishops
1434 deaths
Year of birth unknown
Alumni of Gloucester Hall, Oxford